Rashid Mekki Hassan is the Professor and Director at the Centre for Environmental Economics and Policy in Africa (CEEPA) at the University of Pretoria. He specialises in natural resource and environmental economics, agricultural economics, and optimisation and modelling of economic systems.

Education
Hassan holds a BSc and MSc., both in Agricultural Economics, from the University of Khartoum in 1977 and 1983 respectively. He proceeded to Iowa State University where he got MSc and Ph.D. degrees, both in Economics, in 1988 and 1989 respectively.

Career
Hassan is the professor of economics at the University of Pretoria where he studies natural resources management.

He has authored co-authored and co-edited journal articles and books on Water management in the South Africa which has been used to chart the efficiency of use of water.

He was elected a foreign associate of the US National Academy of Sciences in April 2019.

Select publications

Books
The books which Hassan has authored, co-authored, or co-edited include:

Journal articles
Hassan has written dozens of articles include:

References

External links
Profile on ResearchGate
Profile on Google Scholar

Environmental economists
Ecological economists
Sudanese economists
21st-century South African economists
University of Khartoum alumni
Iowa State University alumni
Academic staff of the University of Pretoria
Living people
Year of birth missing (living people)
Members of the Academy of Science of South Africa
Foreign associates of the National Academy of Sciences
Fellows of the African Academy of Sciences